Gholamali (also Romanized as Gholāmʿalī; also known as Gholāmʿali Ābād) is a village in Abezhdan Rural District, Abezhdan District, Andika County, Khuzestan Province, Iran. At the 2006 census, its population was 32, in 6 families.

References 

Populated places in Andika County